The Cheltenham Spa Express is a British named passenger train service from Paddington station, in London, to Cheltenham Spa, in Gloucestershire, via Reading, Kemble, Stroud, Stonehouse and Gloucester. During the 1930s, when operated by the Great Western Railway, the service was more popularly known as the Cheltenham Flyer.

However, in 1923 the first batch of Charles Collett's GWR 4073 Class (also called Castle Class) 4-6-0 express engines entered service and this enabled a significant improvement in timings. The name "Cheltenham Spa Express" was given to the service, which reached Paddington in 75 minutes from Swindon, an average speed of  making it the fastest start-to-stop scheduled service in Britain.

Fierce rivalry between the four main railway companies during the 1920s and 1930s to run the fastest train in the country, and therefore in the world, led to further accelerations to the service. By now the train had acquired its popular nickname of the "Cheltenham Flyer", although this was never adopted officially.

Such a journey speed had never been previously recorded and this made this run the fastest railway run in the world. The train was hauled by Castle class 5006 Tregenna Castle and was crewed by Driver Harry Rudduck and Fireman Thorp of Old Oak Common shed.

The unofficial title of Cheltenham Flyer, never used officially in timetables, ceased currency before World War 2 when trains elsewhere regularly achieved faster timings but British Rail Western Region, as the successor to the Great Western Railway, continued to use the "Cheltenham Spa Express" brand until the 1960s, when it fell out of use. It was reintroduced in 1984, and continues to be used by Great Western Railway. , the "Cheltenham Spa Express" forms the 11:36 departure from Paddington (arriving in Cheltenham at 14:03), and the 14:46 departure from Cheltenham (arriving in London at 16:56). (The service runs Mondays–Fridays only.)

Notes

References

Citations

References

Further reading
"Great Western Railway Engines" 1938. Republished by David & Charles: Newton Abbot. 1971.

External links
The Cheltenham Flyer Mike's Railway History
First Great Western

Named passenger trains of the Great Western Railway
Named passenger trains of British Rail
Railway services introduced in 1923
Transport in Cheltenham